Milton Thomas Wynn (born September 21, 1978) is a former professional American football wide receiver. He was drafted in the fourth round of the 2001 NFL Draft by the St. Louis Rams. He played college football for the Washington State Cougars.

Wynn has also been a member of the Tampa Bay Buccaneers, Houston Texans, Atlanta Falcons and Baltimore Ravens.

Professional career

Pre-draft

St. Louis Rams
Wynn was drafted in the fourth round (116th overall) by the St. Louis Rams in the 2001 NFL Draft. He signed with the Rams on July 19 and was waived on September 2.

Tampa Bay Buccaneers
On September 4, 2001, Wynn was claimed by the Tampa Bay Buccaneers. In one game with Tampa Bay, he had four catches and 69 yards. He was released on August 27, 2002.

After trying out with the San Francisco 49ers, Wynn signed with the Houston Texans on October 16, and was sent to their practice squad. He was waived on November 6.

Wynn was signed to the Atlanta Falcons practice squad on November 13, 2002. The Baltimore Ravens signed Wynn from the Falcons' practice squad on November 26. Over two seasons in Baltimore he played in three games. He was waived on August 25, 2003.

References

1978 births
Living people
People from Mission Hills, Santa Barbara County, California
Players of American football from California
Sportspeople from Santa Barbara County, California
American football wide receivers
Washington State Cougars football players
St. Louis Rams players
Tampa Bay Buccaneers players
Houston Texans players
Atlanta Falcons players
Baltimore Ravens players